Supreme Pictures Corporation was a film production company in the United States. It produced dozens of Western genre films. It was run by Sam Katzman and A. W. Hackel.

It made Westerns starring Johnny Mack Brown as well as  Bob Steele.

The company also produced the film Am I Guilty? starring Ralph Cooper and an African American cast.

Filmography
The Crooked Trail (1936)
The Kid Ranger (1936)
Last of the Warrens (1936)
Rogue of the Range (1936)
Brand of the Outlaws (1936)
Undercover Man (1936)
Am I Guilty? (1940)

References

Film production companies of the United States